Chiggers are tiny harvest mites, members of the family Trombiculidae, that can cause intense itching and dermatitis.

Chigger may also refer to:

 Chigger (word), a Tasmanian synonym for the Australian word "bogan" (an unrefined or unsophisticated person)
 Chigger bite or Trombiculosis, the rash caused by chiggers
 Chigger Browne (1888–1955), American football player and track coach
 Chigger flower, a species of milkweed native to eastern North America
 Nesmith Chigger, a model of airplane
 A satirical word on Chinese nationalism

See also

 Chigger Hill, Alabama, an unincorporated community in DeKalb County, Alabama, United States
 
 Chig (disambiguation)
 Chigoe flea or jigger (Tunga penetrans), often confused with chiggers
 Jigger (disambiguation)